Higashi-takasu is a Hiroden station on Hiroden Miyajima Line, located in Takasu, Nishi-ku, Hiroshima.

Routes
From Higashi-takasu Station, there is one of Hiroden Streetcar routes.
 Hiroshima Station - Hiroden-miyajima-guchi Route

Connections
█ Miyajima Line

Hiroden-nishi-hiroshima — Higashi-takasu — Takasu

Around station
Nishi-Hiroshima Bypass

History
Opened on December 1, 1964.

See also
Hiroden Streetcar Lines and Routes

References

Hiroden Miyajima Line stations
Railway stations in Japan opened in 1964